

Youth
Born in Pittsburgh, Leven grew up in Hampton, Pennsylvania.  During this time he played for the Pittsburgh Strikers and Beadling SC club teams, while also playing for Western Pennsylvania ODP.  He graduated from Hampton High School.  He attended the Ohio State University, playing on the men's soccer team from 1996 to 2000. Leven graduated with a degree in Management Information Systems (MIS).

Professional player career
Leven started his career with the now defunct Pittsburgh Stingers in the Continental Indoor Soccer League (CISL). The Pittsburgh Riverhounds signed Leven in 1999 as an undrafted free agent.  In the fall of 2000, Leven was transferred to the Columbus Crew where he participated as a training team member.  Leven retired from professional soccer in 2002.  Leven was inducted into his high school sports hall of fame in 2006.

Coaching career

College Coaching
Tiffin University Men’s Soccer Assistant Coach - 2002 – 2005
Heidelberg University Director of Soccer & Head Men’s Soccer Coach - 2005 – 2010
Otterbein University Men’s Soccer Coach - 2010 – 2015

High school coaching
New Albany High School (Ohio) - Varsity Girls Soccer Assistant Coach - 2010 - 2015
Gahanna Christian Academy - Head Varsity Boys Soccer Coach - 2016
Bexley High School - Head Varsity Girls Soccer Coach - 2017 - 2019

Youth club coaching
Hampton Soccer Club - 1995 - 1996
Dublin Soccer Club - 1996 - 2009
New Albany Soccer Club - 2009 - 2016
Columbus Crew Youth Development Program - 2011 - 2016
FC614 - 2016 - 2019
Ohio Premier - 2021 - Present

References

1977 births
Living people
American soccer players
Pittsburgh Stingers players
Pittsburgh Riverhounds SC players
A-League (1995–2004) players
USISL Select League players
Soccer players from Pittsburgh
Association football forwards 
Association football midfielders